Frank Glick (August 22, 1893 – August 13, 1979) was an American football player and coach.  He was the 14th head football coach at Lehigh University in Bethlehem, Pennsylvania
and he held that position for the 1921 season. His overall coaching record at Lehigh was 4–4.

Head coaching record

References

1893 births
1979 deaths
American football ends
American football halfbacks
Lehigh Mountain Hawks football coaches
Princeton Tigers football coaches
Princeton Tigers football players
Sportspeople from Pittsburgh
Players of American football from Pittsburgh